The 1962 International cricket season was from May 1962 to August 1962.

Season overview

June

Pakistan in England

July

Ireland in Scotland

References

1962 in cricket